Joseph H. Bradford (born c. 1854) was a teacher, lawyer, and state legislator in Arkansas. He served in the Arkansas House of Representatives in 1885. He was a Republican. His photograph is among those of his fellow 1885 Arkansas House members. He represented Mississippi County.

He was born in Tennessee. According to the House photograph's captioning, he was a lawyer, 29, Rapublican, born in Tennessee and had lived in Arkansas for 17 years, and his post office was in Osceola, Arkansas.

See also
African-American officeholders during and following the Reconstruction era

References

Members of the Arkansas House of Representatives
1850s births